Lower Reaches is the third solo album by singer/songwriter Justin Currie, best known for his involvement in the band Del Amitri. The album was released on August 19, 2013. Listen on Spotify.

Track listing
All songs written by Justin Currie.
"Falsetto" – 3:50
"Every Song's the Same" – 2:30
"Bend to My Will" – 3:37
"Priscilla" – 3:31
"I Hate Myself for Loving You" – 2:30
"On a Roll" – 3:30
"Into a Pearl" – 4:12
"On My Conscience" – 2:50
"Half of Me" – 3:07
"Little Stars" – 4:15
"Guess" (bonus track) – 3:08
"London is Dead" (bonus track) – 2:49

Personnel
Josh Block – drums, tambourine
Jesse Ebaugh – upright and electric bass
Davíd Garza – piano, organ, acoustic and electric guitar, background vocals
Ricky Ray Jackson – acoustic, electric and pedal steel guitar
Jim McDermott – drums
Bruce Robison – background vocals

References 

2013 albums
Justin Currie albums